Scambophyllum is a genus of bush cricket in the subfamily Phaneropterinae. Species can be found mostly in Indo-China and Malesia.

Species
The Orthoptera Species File and Catalogue of Life list:
Scambophyllum albomarginatum Hebard, 1922
Scambophyllum angustipenne Karny, 1926
Scambophyllum basileus Karny, 1926
Scambophyllum pendleburyi Karny, 1926
Scambophyllum rarofasciatum Karny, 1926
Scambophyllum sandakanae Hebard, 1922
Scambophyllum sanguinolentum Westwood, 1848 - type species (as Phylloptera sanguinolenta Westwood)

References

External Links & Illustrations

Flickr: S. angustipenne, ID by Piotr Nasckreki, Danum Valley, Borneo.
Gettyimages: photo from Gunung Penrissen, Sarawak, Malaysia

Orthoptera genera
Tettigoniidae